Central Reception and Assignment Facility (CRAF) is an intake and central processing facility for the New Jersey prison system, located in Trenton, New Jersey.  It was opened in 1997, closed in 2021.

References

Prisons in New Jersey
Buildings and structures in Mercer County, New Jersey
Trenton, New Jersey
1997 establishments in New Jersey